The German Association of Female Citizens is the oldest German women's rights organisation, founded on 18 October 1865.

History
The association was created by Louise Otto-Peters and Auguste Schmidt in Leipzig on 18 October 1865. The first SPD chairman August Bebel was also present when the association was founded. It was originally named the General German Women's Association.

One example of their early work was when Maria von Linden was refused full entry as a student to University of Tübingen. She was allowed by a vote of 8 to 10 to be allowed as a guest student. Her studies were financed and supported by this association. Linden would become one of Germany's first female professors.

The association adopted its current name in 1918. The German Association of Female Citizens is affiliated with the International Alliance of Women.

See also
 Frauenwohl

References

External links
German Association of Female Citizens

Liberal feminist organizations
Women's rights organizations
Women's organisations based in Germany
Feminism in Germany
Organizations established in 1865